Jonathan Kozol (born September 5, 1936) is an American writer, progressive activist, and educator, best known for his books on public education in the United States.

Education and experience

Born to Harry Kozol and Ruth (Massell) Kozol, Jonathan graduated from Noble and Greenough School in 1954, and Harvard University summa cum laude in 1958 with an A.B. in English literature. He was awarded a Rhodes Scholarship to Magdalen College, Oxford. He did not, however, complete his scholarship, deciding instead to go to Paris to learn to write fiction and nonfiction from experienced authors such as William Styron, Richard Wright, and others who were living in Paris at the time. It was upon his return that he began to tutor children in Roxbury, MA, and soon became a teacher in the Boston Public Schools.  He was fired for teaching a Langston Hughes poem, as described in Death at an Early Age, and then became deeply involved in the civil rights movement. After being fired from Boston Public Schools, he was offered a position to teach at Newton Public Schools, the school district he attended as a child, and taught there for several years before becoming more deeply involved in social justice work and dedicating more time to writing. Kozol is of Jewish heritage.

Kozol has since held two Guggenheim Fellowships, has twice been a fellow of the Rockefeller Foundation, and has also received fellowships from the Field and Ford Foundations.

Kozol also has worked in the field of social psychology. He has been working with children in inner-city schools for more than forty years. Kozol is currently on the editorial board of Greater Good Magazine, published by the Greater Good Science Center at the University of California, Berkeley.  Kozol's contributions include the interpretation of scientific research into the roots of compassion, altruism, and peaceful human relationships.

Writing career

Death at an Early Age, his first non-fiction book, is a description of his first year as a teacher in the Boston Public Schools. It was published in 1967 and won the National Book Award in Science, Philosophy and Religion. It has sold more than two million copies in the United States and Europe.

Among the other books by Kozol are Rachel and Her Children: Homeless Families in America, which received the Robert F. Kennedy Book award for 1989 and the Conscience-in-Media Award of the American Society of Journalists and Authors, and Savage Inequalities: Children in America's Schools, which won the New England Book Award and was a finalist for the National Book Critics Circle Award in 1992.

His 1995 book, Amazing Grace: The Lives of Children and the Conscience of a Nation, described his visits to the South Bronx of New York City, the poorest congressional district in the United States. It received the Anisfield-Wolf Book Award in 1996.

He published Ordinary Resurrections: Children in the Years of Hope in 2000 and The Shame of the Nation: The Restoration of Apartheid Schooling in America was released September 13, 2005.  Kozol documents the continuing and often worsening segregation in public schools in the United States, and the increasing influence of neoconservative ideology on the way children, particularly children of color and poor children of urban areas, are educated.

He is still active in advocating for integrated public education in the United States and is a critic of the school voucher movement. He continues to condemn the inequalities of education and the apparently worsening segregation of black and Hispanic children from white children in the segregated public schools of almost every major city of the nation.  Kozol's ethical argument relies heavily on comparisons between rich and poor school districts.  In particular, he analyzes the amount of money spent per child.  He finds that in school districts whose taxpayers and property-owners are relatively wealthy, the per-child annual spending is much higher (for example, over $20,000 per year per child in one district) than in school districts where poor people live (for example, $11,000 per year per child in one district). He asks rhetorically whether it is right that the place of one's birth should determine the quality of one's education.

Non-profit

Kozol founded The Education Action Fund, which serves as a nonprofit charitable fund that provides direct assistance to many of the children and families profiled in his books. Donations to the EAF go directly towards children and families living in impoverished or racially isolated areas, and often provide a much-needed relief from financial instability.

Awards and honors

1968 National Book Award for Death at an Early Age.
1970 and 1980 Guggenheim Fellowship
1972 Field Foundation Fellowship
1974 Field Foundation Fellowship
1978 and 1983 Rockefeller Fellowship
1988 Conscience in Media Award from the American Society of Journalists and Authors
1988 Christopher Award
1992 New England Book Award
1996 Anisfield-Wolf Book Award for Amazing Grace2005 Puffin/Nation Prize for Creative Citizenship.
2013 The Deborah W. Meier Hero in Education Award from FairTest

WorksThe Fume of Poppies (1958) A novel.Death at an Early Age: The Destruction of the Hearts and Minds of Negro Children in the Boston Public Schools. First published in 1967, it won the National Book Award and sold more than two million copies. It describes his year of teaching in the Boston Public School System.  Reissue Free Schools (1972) The Night is Dark and I Am Far from Home (1975) Children of the Revolution: A Yankee Teacher in the Cuban Schools (1978) Prisoners of Silence: Breaking the Bonds of Adult Illiteracy in the United States (1980) On Being a Teacher (1981) Alternative Schools: A Guide for Educators and Parents (1982) Illiterate America (1986) Rachel and Her Children: Homeless Families in America (1988) Awarded the Robert F. Kennedy Book Award for 1989 and The Conscience in Media Award of the American Society of Journalists and Authors, and the Christopher Award, 1988. Reprint Savage Inequalities: Children in America's Schools (1991) A finalist for the 1992 National Book Critics Circle Award and awarded The New England Book Award. Reprint  Bookfinder collected reviews.Amazing Grace: The Lives of Children and the Conscience of a Nation (1995) Reprint   Review and appreciation by Mary Leue.Ordinary Resurrections: Children in the Years of Hope (2000) Reprint .  Review by Jana Siciliano at BookReporter.com.The Shame of the Nation: The Restoration of Apartheid Schooling in America (2005) Letters to a Young Teacher (2007) Fire in the Ashes: Twenty-Five Years Among the Poorest Children in America (2012) The Theft of Memory: Losing My Father One Day at a Time (2015) 

See also
Boston Public Schools
Education in the United States
Racial inequality in the United States

References

External links

Jonathan Kozol Takes On the World Gary Stager interviews Kozol about The Shame of the Nation: The Restoration of Apartheid Education in America for District Administration Magazine – January 2006 issue.
Jonathan Kozol Speaks Out In this September 2000 interview for Curriculum Administrator Magazine, Kozol talks about his book, Ordinary Resurrections: Children in the Years of Hope'' with Gary Stager.
Explanation of Modern US Education 2005 Talk given by Jonathan Kozol (MP3)
Video: Jonathan Kozol – Letters to a Young Teacher (October 3, 2007), from Mr. Kozol's 2007 book tour.
Video: Jonathan Kozol – The Shame of the Nation: The Restoration of Apartheid Schooling in America (September 30, 2005), from Mr. Kozol's 2005 book tour.

1936 births
Living people
Noble and Greenough School alumni
Harvard Advocate alumni
Alumni of Magdalen College, Oxford
Activists for African-American civil rights
American educational theorists
American education writers
American political writers
American male non-fiction writers
American Rhodes Scholars
Education reform
Jewish American writers
National Book Award winners
Writers from Boston
21st-century American Jews
Jewish anti-racism activists